Thrill Power Overload, or TPO is a book about the history of the British comic 2000 AD written by David Bishop, one of its editors.

History 
The book started life as series of articles written by David Bishop and serialised in the Judge Dredd Megazine, forming the most comprehensive history of the comic 2000 AD yet written.

The articles gave details of the way particular strips were created, the various financial and other external pressures the comic had faced, and some behind the scenes gossip.

A similar follow-up feature, Fifteen Years, Creep!, was a history of the Megazine itself.

Bibliography

The instalments were:

Thrill Power Overload (Judge Dredd Megazine #4.09-205, 2002-2003)
15 Years, Creep! (Judge Dredd Megazine #237-242, 2005-2006)

They have now been collected and expanded into a book:

Thrill Power Overload (Rebellion Developments, 260 pages, hardcover, February 2007, paperback, February 2009)

Awards
2007: Nominated for the "Favourite Comics-Related Book" Eagle Award

External links
Thrill-Power Overload, a blog by David Bishop detailing the writing of the Thrill-Power Overload book
Entry at 2000AD database

2007 non-fiction books
2007 in comics
Books about comics
Works by David Bishop
2000 AD comic strips